Political entities in the 20th century BC – Political entities by century

This is a list of political entities in the 21st century BC.

Political entities

See also
List of Bronze Age states
List of Iron Age states
List of Classical Age states
List of states during Late Antiquity

References

Centuries and millennia

-21
21st century BC